St. Thomas Anglican Church may refer to:

Australia 
St Thomas' Anglican Church, Mulgoa
St Thomas' Anglican Church, Narellan
St Thomas' Anglican Church, North Sydney

Canada 
 St. Thomas' Anglican Church (Moose Factory, Ontario)
 St. Thomas Anglican Church (Shanty Bay, Ontario)
 St. Thomas's Anglican Church (Toronto), Ontario
 St. Thomas Anglican Church (Silver Creek, Quebec)

United States 
St. Thomas Anglican Church (Mountain Home, Arkansas)

See also
St. Thomas' Church (disambiguation)
St Thomas Aquinas Church (disambiguation)